The Criminal Ordinance of 1670 (a.k.a. Ordonnance criminelle de Colbert) was a Great Ordinance dealing with criminal procedure which was enacted in France under the reign of King Louis XIV. Made in Saint-Germain-en-Laye, the Ordinance was registered by the Parliament of Paris on 26 August 1670 and came into effect on 1 January 1671. It was one of the first legal texts attempting to codify criminal law in France. It remained in force until the French Revolution. It was abrogated through a decree adopted by the National Constituent Assembly on 9 October 1789.

The act broadened the jurisdiction of the nationwide policing force Maréchaussée to include burglary and popular disorder and confirmed their power to arrest any offender.  It also sought to combat abuse of their authority by putting enforcement under the supervision of local royal courts.

See also
 French criminal law

References

Further reading

External links 

French criminal law
Laws and ordinances of the Ancien Régime
1670 in law
1670 in France